= Transverse axis =

Transverse axis refers to an axis that is transverse (side to side, relative to some defined "forward" direction). In particular:

- Transverse axis (aircraft)
- Transverse axis of a hyperbola, coincides with the semi-major axis
